Daienne Cardoso Lima (born 9 June 1993) is a Brazilian individual trampolinist, representing her nation at international competitions.

She competed at world championships, including at the 2010, 2011, 2015 Trampoline World Championships.

She has also competed at the 2010 Summer Youth Olympics.

Personal
She lives in Belo Horizonte nowadays.

References

External links
 
 https://usagym.org/pages/post.html?PostID=4537&prog=h
 https://www.youtube.com/watch?v=R21vWVp9WcA
 https://www.youtube.com/watch?v=2CJZJnbvn-I
 http://www.gettyimages.com/detail/news-photo/brazilian-daienne-lima-performs-in-the-trampoline-news-photo/129492884#brazilian-daienne-lima-performs-in-the-trampoline-individual-of-picture-id129492884
 http://www.fig-photos.com/images/trampoline-wch-metz-fra-2010-cardoso-lima-daienne-bra-101115108

1993 births
Living people
Brazilian female trampolinists
Place of birth missing (living people)
Gymnasts at the 2011 Pan American Games
Gymnasts at the 2010 Summer Youth Olympics
Pan American Games competitors for Brazil
21st-century Brazilian women